The 1908 United States presidential election in California  took place on November 3, 1908 as part of the 1908 United States presidential election. State voters chose 10 representatives, or electors, to the Electoral College, who voted for president and vice president.

California voted for the Republican nominee, former War Secretary William Howard Taft, in a landslide over the Democratic nominee, former Nebraska representative and the 1896 and 1900 nominee, William Jennings Bryan.

Results

Results by county

References

California
1908
1908 California elections